DJ Boston  (real name — Sergei Ledovsky, 26 of March 1983, Krasnokamensk, Russia) is a Russian DJ, composer and producer of house music.

Biography 
Author of the remix to the popular Russian music composition by the famous author Eugene Krylatov to the Russian movie (using the vocal samples from the original movie), author of the popular remix to the song  written by the  popular Belorussian rock band (remix released by the Belorussian record company in the CD compilation ). Author of the song (track has got to the top-hits of the year 2006 radio ).

In the year 2006 Dj Boston has participated in Belorussian-Brazilian project "Viva Brasilia", as the author and composer. The concert tour around the Belarus was organized at the same time.

In 2006 Dj Boston and Ellen Mendonca have recorded and released the CD album «DJ Boston feat. Ellen Mendonca», named in the press as "The first Belorussian-Brazilian album".

In 2012, Dj Boston joined a rap band "Switter Boys"  by the name Sergio "BOSTONBOY", as its co-author and composer. The project was established in July 2012, when it was announced that Jennifer Lopez was coming to Minsk . In honor of her arrival to Belarus for the first time, Switter Boys made a video "I love you, Jennifer Lopez!" and posted it on the internet. The band members also have personally met and photographed with the singer at the front entrance of the hotel where she stayed, at the same time performing to her their own version of Jennifer’s song "Goin' In"  with an accordion and balalaika. However Jennifer Lopez was especially impressed by the accordion and opera-signing used by the band during the performance as she has personally announced  during her Dance Again World Tour Video Conference.

Also in anticipation of the soccer match between "BATE" (Belarus) and "Valencia" (Spain) the band posted on the internet supporting video "BATE Got The Power!". The video made success and got to the prime-time news on the National TV Channel  ONT. However some soccer fans and sport journalists saw another message in the song - in particular, the response to the comment of the famous Russian sport commentator Vasily Utkin about Belorussian Soccer Club “BATE” and its coach Viktor Goncharenko.

On October 25, 2012 popular Belarusian group Akute  in participation with DJ Boston introduced on the Internet a new single album "Igolki" ", the title track of which was a remix version of their song "Adzіnotstva" made by Dj Boston.

In 2013, Dj Boston releases music video "Speed Rider"  with Brazilian singer-songwriter Siberia  (port. Sibéria), originally from Belarus. "Speed Rider" is Dj Boston's first work as both a film director and cinematographer. The video includes some shots from Isle of Man TT racing event and got nearly 2 million views on one of the popular Video Sharing Website.

On 8 October 2014 DJ Boston and Siberia together with Sérgio Menezes, Brazilian actor and entertainer from Rio de Janeiro best known for his works in telenovelas Cheias de Charme (2012), Sinhá Moça (2006) and Celebridade (2003) has launched new music video "Believe". Dj Boston and Sergio first met when filming together in Brazilian comedy series "Politicamente Incorreto"  in 2014 with Danilo Gentili.

Shortly after the video "Believe" was released in 2014 DJ Boston, Siberia and Sergio Menezes has launched the second music video "Listen Yo" (Party) under the direction of DJ Boston. Featuring as a special guest the fellow Brazilian actor José Dumont, best known for his role as the family father in Behind the Sun (Abril Despedaçado), an award-winning film of director Walter Salles.

Discography

Albums
 2002 —  J:Mors “Web-Design” (“Time of the year” (DJ Boston adult contemporary melancholic mix)).
 2004 —  J:Mors “Montevideo” (“Silence on the radars” (remix Dj Boston)).
 2006 —  Dj Boston “Dj Boston feat. Ellen Mendonca”.

Singles
 2002 — J:Морс – Gray Shadow "Time of the year" (DJ Boston Adult Contemporary Melancholic Mix)
 2003 — Remake from the original movie theme "Guest from the future" (DJ Boston remake)
 2004 — J:Moрс - Montevideo "Silence on the radars" (DJ Boston remix)
 2004 — J:Морс - Albion (DJ Boston Arctic sunshine mix)
 2004 — J:Морс - 100 roads “Stop! Stop!“(DJ Boston remix)
 2005 — J:Moрс - My sun (DJ Boston remix)
 2006 — J:Moрс - Princess (DJ Boston remix)
 2006 — Dj Boston - Baby 
 2007 — Remake from the original movie theme "Walking the Streets of Moscow" (DJ Boston remake)
 2009 — J:Moрс - Super Mario (DJ Boston remix)
 2010 — Remake from the original movie theme "Santa-Barbara" (DJ Boston Remix)
 2011 — Lynyrd Skynyrd - Sweet Home Alabama (DJ Boston remix)
 2012 — J:Moрс — Mamonov (DJ Boston remix)
 2012 — Switter Boys - I love you, Jennifer Lopez!
 2012 — Switter Boys - "BATE" Got The Power (DJ Boston mix)
 2012 — Akute - Loneliness (Adzinoztva) (DJ Boston radio edit mix)
 2013 — Dj Boston & Siberia - Big Boy Happy 
 2013 — Dj Boston & Siberia - Speed Rider 
 2013 — Dj Boston & Siberia - Memories 
 2013 — Dj Boston & Siberia - Home 
 2014 — Dj Boston, Siberia feat.Sérgio Menezes - Believe 
 2014 — Dj Boston, Siberia feat.Sérgio Menezes and José Dumont- Listen Yo (Party) 
 2014 — Dj Boston, Siberia feat.Sérgio Menezes- Tonight (#1) 
 2014 — Dj Boston & Siberia - We got away 
 2014 — Dj Boston, Siberia feat.Sérgio Menezes- Academia

Compilations
 2005 — J:Mors “My sun. True story 2000-2005” (“My sun” (remix Dj Boston)).
 2005 — Compilation «Golden TOP 20's. Winter 2006».

Videos
 2012 — Switter Boys - I love you, Jennifer Lopez!
 2012 — Switter Boys - "Bate" got the power!
 2013 — Siberia - Speed Rider
 2013 — Siberia - Home
 2013 — Siberia - Memories
 2014 — Siberia feat.Sergio Menezes - Believe   
 2014 — Siberia feat.Sergio Menezes&Jose Dumont - Listen Yo (Party)
 2015 — Siberia - Tonight ft.Sergio Menezes

References

External links 
 Dj Boston Official Website
 Siberia Official Website
 Dj Boston on Youtube
 Dj Boston on Twitter
 Dj Boston on Soundcloud
 Dj Boston on promodj.ru
 Dj Boston on myspace.com
 Dj Boston's interview on the radio-show E-Groove  Educadora FM (São Paulo, Brazil)
 Dj Boston's interview on the First National Belorussian Radio|Belorussian Radio 106.2FM (Minsk, Belarus)

Articles 
 DJ Boston feat. Ellen Mendonca. Musical newspaper .
 First belorussian-brazilian album. “Tuzin Gitou”.
 «Bessame mucho»: kiss me harder! Newspaper Belarus Today.
 Brazilian singer and belorussian dj have recorded the CD album.
 Brazilian singer and belorussian dj have recorded the CD album. Source:BelaPAN.
 «Bessame mucho»: kiss me harder!
 The singer from Brazil in "Jazz-lunch"
 Belorussian top-chart
 Santa-Barbara (Dj Boston remix)
 Lynyrd Skynyrd - Sweet Home Alabama (Dj Boston remix)
 Brazilian singer and Belorussian Dj recorded a joint album
 Jennifer Lopez: Belorussian Love 
 Switter Boys - I love you, Jennifer Lopez! 
 "I love you, Jennifer Lopez!" on Belorussian National TV Channel "BT"
 SwitterBoys@Belorussian National TV Channel "BT"
 "БАТЭ GOT THE POWER!
 SWITTER BOYS "BATE GOT THE POWER! 
 BATE Body Paint Kick TV 
 DJ Boston на JunoDownload
 Jennifer Lopez meets Belorussian musicians 
 «Switter Boys» supports BATE with naked chest 
 Jennifer Lopez brings to Belarus her boyfriend and 75 people 
 Jennifer Lopez in Minsk! 
 Akute played in Brazil
 Akute presented a new single album "Igolki"
 Akute played in Brazil
 Akute played in Brazil
 Brazilian-Belorussian single album Akute

1983 births
Living people
Club DJs
Russian house musicians